"Torch Song" is a short story by John Cheever which first appeared in The New Yorker on October 4, 1947. The work was included in the short fiction collection The Enormous Radio and Other Stories (1953), published by Funk and Wagnalls. "Torch Song" is included in The Stories of John Cheever (1978).

A work often anthologized, the story is a modern rendering of the mythological Angel of Death.

Plot
Jack Lorey is a twenty-something transplant to New York City, formerly of Ohio, who is seeking a career in New York City. He encounters Joan Harris at a social gathering, who hails from the same Ohio town as Jack. She has abandoned her hopes of becoming a professional model, and serves at a number of entry level jobs to support herself. Joan's demeanor is that of a healthy, well-adjusted and tolerant woman who enjoys social life. Jack and Joan form a casual platonic relationship, each pursuing their own romantic interests. 

During the ensuing years Jack is twice married and divorced, yet his life continues to intersect with that of Joan, who retains her preternatural good looks and vitality. Jack notes that her paramours are generally men in their maturity, all of whom are physically impressive, but typically alcoholics down on their luck. Some are European emigres, one who poses as an impoverished member of nobility. Joan, who exhibits boundless good cheer and stoic patience toward these men—some of whom cruelly abuse her—remains their faithful patroness. Her good health contrasts sharply with the gradual moral or physical deterioration of her lovers.

When Jack returns from serving in the military in World War II, he suffers financial setbacks and falls ill for months. Joan appears at his sickbed and offers to nurture him back to health. Jack has a shocking epiphany: all of Joan's male lovers have never recovered from their illnesses and bad fortune. It dawns on him that Joan is a benevolent Angel of Death, who has arrived only to preside over his passing. Despite Jack's panicked expulsion of Joan from his room, she serenely insists on returning that evening. Jack prepares to flee from the premises, his ultimate fate unknown.

Critical assessment
James E. O'Hara regards "Torch Song" as one in a "breakthrough trilogy" that marked a distinct advance in the depth and complexity of Cheever's storytelling (The other two stories are "The Enormous Radio and Other Stories" and "Roseheath", also published in The New Yorker in 1947).

Theme
Literary critic Lynne Waldeland notes that Cheever's "ominous introduction" in "Torch Song" anticipates its disturbing climax. :

Biographer Patrick Meanor identifies Joan Harris with the mythological figure Hecate of Greek antiquity, "known as one of the most notorious witches or sorcereesses of the ancient world." She escorts her victims by torchlight to the Underworld. Meanor writes:

Meanor adds this caveat: "There is no question that her character has a vampiric quality, but what makes her the frightening figure she becomes as the story unfolds is that she seems totally unaware of her mythical identity or her necromantic powers."

Literary critic James E. O'Hara cautions that Cheever's narrative is vulnerable to  "misunderstandings" that may expose the author to accusations of misogyny. O'Hara writes:

O'Hara further argues that Cheever "removed the idea of deliberate evil from his portrayal of Joan for a thematic reason. He chose not to oversimplify her in order to drive home the point that evil does not depend on human volition for its existence…"Torch Song" disturbs us precisely because it does not simplify the moral universe."

Footnotes

Sources 
Bailey, Blake. 2009 (1). Notes on Text in John Cheever: Collected Stories and Other Writing. The Library of America. Pp.1025-1028 
Bailey, Blake. 2009 (2). Cheever: A Life. Alfred A. Knopf, New York. 770 pp. 
Coale, Samuel. 1977. John Cheever. Frederick Ungar Publishing Company, New York. 
Donaldson, Scott. 1988. John Cheever: A Biography. Random House, New York. 
Meanor, Patrick. 1995. John Cheever Revisited. Twayne Publishers, New York. 
O'Hara, James E. 1989. John Cheever: A Study of the Short Fiction. Twayne Publishers, Boston Massachusetts. Twayne Studies in Short Fiction no 9. 
Waldeland, Lynne. 1979. John Cheever. Twayne Publishers, G. K. Hall & Company, Boston, Massachusetts. 

1947 short stories
Short stories by John Cheever
Works originally published in The New Yorker